Rayara Sose is a 1957 Indian Kannada-language film produced by Pandari Bai and directed by R. Ramamurthy and K. S. Murthy. It stars Rajkumar, Kalyan Kumar, Mynavathi, H. Ramachandra Shastry, Pandari Bai and Ramadevi. The music of the film was composed by R. Diwakara. This movie has S. Janaki's first released Kannada film song Thaalalentho Shokavega. The movie speaks against the evil practice of dowry. This is Rajkumar's first social drama movie. The movie was based on a Marathi play.

Cast
 H. Ramachandra Shastry as Aravind's father
 Kalyan Kumar as Aravind
 Rajkumar as Dr. Govind
 Pandari Bai as Geetha, Dr. Govind's wife
 Narasimharaju as Ganapa
 Balakrishna
 Mynavathi as Aravind's wife
 M. Jayashree as Aravind's mother
 Ramadevi as Ganapa's mother
 M. N. Lakshmi Devi
 Padmini Priyadarshini

Soundtrack
The music of the film was composed by R. Diwakar with lyrics penned by Gundu Rao. This is the first released Kannada film with a song of playback singer S. Janaki.

References

External links
 Rayara Sose on Chiloka
 Allmoviedatabase.com
 Gaana.com
 

1957 films
1950s Kannada-language films
Films directed by R. Ramamurthy